Garoe may refer to:

Garoowe, capital city of the autonomous Puntland region in northeastern Somalia
Garoé, tree that used to be sacred in the Canarian island of El Hierro